Asa Ellis (1817–1890) served as a member of the 1867-69 California State Assembly, representing the 2nd District. He also served on the Los Angeles County Board of Supervisors in 1864. He is interred at Savannah Memorial Park Cemetery in Rosemead, California.

References

Members of the California State Assembly
1817 births
1890 deaths
19th-century American politicians